Francis J. Vassallo is a Maltese economist. He was Governor of the Central Bank of Malta from 1992 to 1997.

In 1998 Vassallo founded his own company, Francis J. Vassallo & Associates Ltd (FJVA), a corporate services provider licensed by the Malta Financial Service Authority (MFSA). The company group has since branched out, via FJV Fiduciary Limited and FJV Management Limited, into tax, trusts, foundations, regulatory advisory services and yacht registrations.

Francis J. Vassallo is also a member of the board of directors of FIMBank plc.

In 2000 Francis J. Vassallo joined the Order of Malta as a Knight of Magistral Grace. In November 2015 he took vows of poverty, chastity and obedience in the oratory of Saint John's Co-Cathedral.

Francis J. Vassallo was married to Erminia (Mimici) née Miceli Farrugia. They had three children: Alexia, Adriana and Steffan, and eight grandchildren. His wife Erminia passed in 2013.

References

Maltese economists
Living people
Governors of the Central Bank of Malta
Year of birth missing (living people)
20th-century Maltese businesspeople